Einar Juhl (8 April 1896 - 1 June 1982) was a Danish film actor. He appeared in 50 films between 1924 and 1974. He was born and died in Denmark.

Filmography

Ole Opfinders offer - 1924
I kantonnement - 1932
Han, hun og Hamlet - 1932
De bør forelske Dem - 1935
Jens Langkniv (film) - 1940
Damen med de lyse handsker - 1942
De tre skolekammerater - 1944
De røde enge - 1945
Hans store aften - 1946
Diskret ophold - 1946
My name is Petersen - 1947
Lise kommer til byen - 1947
Tre år efter - 1948
Den stjålne minister - 1949
For frihed og ret - 1949
Smedestræde 4 - 1950
Lynfotografen - 1950
Din fortid er glemt - 1950
Familien Schmidt - 1951
Det sande ansigt - 1951
Husmandstøsen - 1952
Vejrhanen - 1952
Vi arme syndere - 1952
Far til fire - 1953
Adam og Eva - 1953
Jan går til filmen - 1954
Far til fire i sneen - 1954
Gengæld - 1955
Mod og mandshjerte - 1955
På tro og love - 1955
Flintesønnerne - 1956
Far til fire i byen - 1956
Far til fire og onkel Sofus - 1957
Far til fire og ulveungerne - 1958
Vagabonderne på Bakkegården - 1958
Far til fire på Bornholm - 1959
Frihedens pris - 1960
Mine tossede drenge - 1961
Far til fire med fuld musik - 1961
Paradis retur - 1964
Kampen om Næsbygaard - 1964
Tine - 1964
Mig og min lillebror - 1967
Olsen-banden (film) - 1968
Det er så synd for farmand - 1968

References

External links

1896 births
1982 deaths
Danish male film actors
Male actors from Copenhagen